Baron Byng High School was an English-language public high school on Saint Urbain Street in Montreal, Quebec, opened by Governor General of Canada Julian Byng, 1st Viscount Byng of Vimy in 1921. The school was attended largely by working-class Jewish Montrealers from its establishment until the 1960s. Baron Byng High School's alumni include many accomplished academics, artists, businesspeople and politicians.

Baron Byng has been immortalized in many books, including in Mordecai Richler's The Apprenticeship of Duddy Kravitz, St. Urbain's Horseman, and Joshua Then and Now as Fletcher's Field High School.

History

At the beginning of the 20th century, Quebec's confessional school system prohibited Jews from attending French-language Catholic schools, relegating them to Protestant schools. By 1916, Jews made up 44% of the total enrolment in Montreal's English-language Protestant schools. Jewish participation, however, was forbidden on school committees and at the Protestant School Board, and Jewish teachers were discriminated against in terms of employment opportunities. Throughout the period of mass Jewish migration to Montreal, the Board enforced a policy of segregation in its schools.

Built by the Protestant School Board in 1921, Baron Byng High School was named in honour of Julian Byng, Governor General of Canada from 1921 to 1926 and a distinguished World War I soldier. The school was designed by Montreal architect John Smith Archibald. The population of Baron Byng was consciously constructed to be Jewish by the Board, which sought to segregate Jews to avoid the dilution of English-Canadian culture and Protestant religious instruction taught in their public schools. From the 1920s through to the mid-1960s, the student population was largely Jewish, reaching 99 per cent by 1938, though the faculty and staff were resolutely English-Canadian.

Baron Byng's students went on strike in 1934 to protest the School Board's increase of school fees and reduction in teachers' salaries. In April 1945, Baron Byng held a commemorative service for the second anniversary of the Warsaw Ghetto Uprising, sponsored by the Canadian Jewish Congress; speakers included Baruch Zuckerman and Michael Garber.

In the 1960s, there was an influx of Moroccan Jewish students and a French section was created. By the 1970s, there were a significant number of students of Greek and other origins.

Eventually, Quebec education laws prohibited the immigrant population from attending English schools. For lack of sufficient enrolment in the school's territory and rising costs, the Protestant School Board was forced to close the school in June 1980. After the school's closure, the Baron Byng building became home of the non-profit community organization Sun Youth. An extensive online museum was created in 2016 to honour the school's illustrious history.

Notable people

Alumni

 Len Birman (1932– ), actor
 Harry Blank (1925– ), Liberal MNA
 Myer Bloom  (1928–2016), physicist
 Michael Fainstat (1923–2010), politician 
 Morris Fish  (1938– ), Supreme Court Justice
 Samuel Gesser  (1930–2008), entertainment entrepreneur
 Alan Gold  (1917–2005), Chief Justice of Quebec
 Phil Gold  (1936– ), physician
 Yoine Goldstein (1934–2020), senator
 Benjamin Greenberg (1933–2019), Quebec Superior Court Justice
 Henry Gordon (1919–2009), journalist and magician
 Harold Greenberg  (1930–1996), film producer
 Harry Gulkin (1927–2018), film and theatre producer
 Goldie Hershon (1942–2020), President of Canadian Jewish Congress
 Maxwell Kalman (1906–2009), architect
A. M. Klein (1909–1972), poet
Michael Laucke (1947– ), concert guitarist
Irving Layton  (1912–2006), poet
Sylvia Lefkovitz (1924–1987), painter and sculptor
David Lewis  (1909–1981), Rhodes Scholar (1932), Leader of the New Democratic Party (1971–75)
Marilyn Lightstone (1940– ), actress
Frederick Lowy  (1933– ), medical educator and President of Concordia University
Rudolph Marcus (1923– ), chemist; Nobel Prize in Chemistry (1992)
Herbert Marx (1932–2020), Quebec Minister of Justice and Superior Court Justice
 Dorothy Morton (1924–2008), pianist and professor of music
Louis Nirenberg (1925–2020), mathematician; Abel Prize (2015)
Alfred Pinsky (1921–1999), artist and art educator
 Jack Rabinovitch  (1930–2017), founder of the Giller Prize
Simon Reisman  (1919–2008), Deputy Finance Minister
Mordecai Richler  (1931–2001), author
Fred Rose (1907–1983), Communist MP
Philip Seeman  (1934–2021), schizophrenia researcher
William Shatner  (1931– ), actor
 Reuben Ship (1917–1975), playwright and screenwriter
 Sydney Shulemson  (1915–2007), World War II soldier
 Tobie Steinhouse (1925– ), painter and printmaker
 Lionel Tiger (1937– ), anthropologist
Lorne Trottier  (1945– ), businessman
 Gerry Weiner (1933– ), Minister of Immigration
 Eli Yablonovitch (1946– ), physicist

Faculty
Anne Savage (1896–1971), painter and art teacher

References 

1921 establishments in Quebec
English-language schools in Quebec
High schools in Montreal
Jews and Judaism in Montreal
Jews and Judaism in Quebec
Le Plateau-Mont-Royal
Mordecai Richler